William 'Will' Henry Jenkins (born 4 July 1994) is an English former first-class cricketer.

Jenkins was born at Yeovil in July 1994. He was educated at Millfield, before going up to Durham University. While studying at Durham, he played first-class cricket for Durham MCCU, making five appearances from 2014–16. He scored a total of 52 runs in his five matches, with a high score of 19, while with the ball he took 5 wickets with his right-arm medium pace bowling, at an average of 81.40 and with best figures of 2 for 27.

References

External links

1994 births
Living people
People from Yeovil
People educated at Millfield
Alumni of Durham University
English cricketers
Durham MCCU cricketers